M. Kumarasamy College of Engineering (MKCE) is located in Thalavapalayam on the way to Karur and Salem. The college was founded by M. Kumarasamy, the correspondent and also the management trustee of M. Kumarasamy Health & Education Trust in the year of 2001. The college is affiliated to the Anna University, Chennai and also approved by the All India Council of Technical Education, New Delhi. Mr. Raja Subramanian is the college's general manager.

MKCE (autonomous) history 

MKCE established in the year 2000 by the M. Kumarasamy Health and Educational Trust. 
In November 2011 upgraded as Autonomous Institution and affiliated to Anna University, Chennai.
Accredited by NAAC.

Undergraduate courses 

B.E-Computer Science And Engineering
B.E-Electronics And Communication Engineering
B.E-Electrical And Electronics Engineering
B.E-Electronics And Instrumentation Engineering
B.Tech-Information Technology
B.E-Mechanical Engineering
B.E-Civil Engineering
B.TECH-Artificial Intelligence And Datascience

Postgraduate courses 

M.B.A
M.C.A-Computer Applications
ME CSE
ME VLSI
ME MFE
ME Power System
ME Communication System

Value added courses 
Value added courses are designed and offered by each department. These courses are conducted after the regular college hours. In addition to the above other course offered are, BEC Course, C Language, Catia, Embedded Systems, Fundamentals of Computer Programming, Infosys Campus Connect Programme, Lab View, MAT Lab, Rational Suite (IBM), Solid Works, Spoken English, Tele – logic, TV Assembly & Servicing Courses, VLSI Design,

MKCE activities 
Interacting with industrial establishments and identifying suitable areas for helping the students to undertake project work
Organizing career guidance programmes.
Involving student co-coordinators as placement canvassers by entrusting them with the duty of visiting employer industries.
Making outstation placement - finding trips by TPO to employer industries/firms/companies/organization to fix on-campus interview programmes.
Conducting regular aptitude tests for the pre-final and final year students to improve the students thinking power, alertness and analytical power.
Involving external trainers for soft skill development
Conducting specific pre-placement training programmes for participants of on and off campus interviews.
Maintaining a close contact with employer industries by furnishing them with latest profile of the college and the resume of students to enhance the scope of employability among students.
Maintaining relationship with renowned placement consultants and recruiting agencies to widen the job-net for the students.
Conducting periodical meeting with alumni.
Transmitting information on placement interviews to the alumni through group mail ids.

Placement cell 
The department functions with a full-time placement officer and communication and training officers.

Activities 
Interacting with industrial establishments and identifying suitable areas for helping the students to undertake project work.

Organizing career guidance programmes.

Involving student co-coordinators as placement canvassers by entrusting them with the duty of visiting employer industries.

Making outstation placement - finding trips by TPO to employer industries/firms/companies/organization to fix on-campus interview programmes.

Conducting regular aptitude tests for the pre-final and final year students to improve the students thinking power, alertness and analytical power.

Involving external trainers for soft skill development.

Conducting specific pre-placement training programmes for participants of on and off campus interviews.

Maintaining a close contact with employer industries by furnishing them with latest profile of the college and the resume of students to enhance the scope of employability among students.

Maintaining relationship with renowned placement consultants and recruiting agencies to widen the job-net for the students.

Conducting periodical meeting with alumni.

Transmitting information on placement interviews to the alumni through group mail ids.

College library 
The Library started its service in 2000 as a part of MKCE. The fully computerized Library Information Systems helps the staff and students tremendously in day-to-day operations.

The Library uses LIPS-i-NET software system with barcode scanning facility. Every document in the Library bears a barcode tag that is used for its circulation.

Science and humanities

Maths 
The Mathematics Department was established in the year 2000 with the destination of offering basic knowledge to the undergraduate students in Science and Technology. It fulfills the basic needs of undergraduate students and strengthens their knowledge in mathematics.

Physics 
The physics department was established in the year 2000 with the destination of offering basic knowledge to the undergraduate students in Science and Technology. It fulfills the basic needs of undergraduate students and strengthens their knowledge in physics.

Facilities available (physics) 
 Physics Laboratory as per the specification of Anna University, Coimbatore
 Laboratory to conduct physics practicals to I Year B.E / B.Tech.
 Faculty members

Chemistry 
The Department of chemistry was established in the year 2000 with the destination of offering basic knowledge to the undergraduate students in Science and Technology. It fulfills the basic needs of undergraduate students and strengthens their knowledge in Chemistry.

English

Lab facilities (English)
 The Language Lab is equipped with 61 computer systems loaded with self-language learning software.
 In addition to that visual aids like Television, DVD player and LCD projector are used to hone the soft skills.

Examination cell 
The examination cell operates under the guidance of the academic
coordinator, with the principal as the chief superintendent during university examinations.

 Providing information related to university examinations to students.
 Conducting university examinations in both theory and practical.
 Conducting model examinations in both theory and practical.
 Conducting class test and terminal test.
 Preparing schedules for both continuous assignments and class tests.
 Making all basic arrangements for conducting examinations and sending the scripts for central valuation.
 Informing the university about the internal marks and the attendance details of the students.
 Analyzing the semester results and preparing rank lists to pick the best students for awarding prizes.
 Keeping the parents informed about their wards’ performance in the model and also university examinations and class and terminal tests.
 Calling the average and the below average students for counseling and guidance.
 Conducting re-test is the best way in this college.

Mkce library collections 
 Total number of books :33,000
 Total number of titles :16,297
 Non-book materials :2750
 Total number of journals  :22

Engineering colleges in Tamil Nadu
Colleges affiliated to Anna University
Karur